Natallia Vasileuskaya (born 23 February 1991) is a Belarusian handballer who plays for Gloria Bistrița and the Belarus national team.

Achievements  
Romanian National League: 
Winner: 2019
Romanian Cup: 
Finalist: 2018, 2019
Belarusian Championship:  
Silver Medalist: 2013, 2013

References

1991 births
Living people
People from Zel’va District
Belarusian female handball players
Expatriate handball players
Belarusian expatriate sportspeople in France
Belarusian expatriate sportspeople in Russia
Belarusian expatriate sportspeople in Hungary
Belarusian expatriate sportspeople in Romania
Békéscsabai Előre NKSE players
Sportspeople from Grodno Region